Megachile distinguenda is a species of bee in the family Megachilidae. It was described by Ruiz in 1941.

References

Distinguenda
Insects described in 1941